Borniopsis is a genus of bivalves belonging to the family Lasaeidae.

Species
 Borniopsis ariakensis Habe, 1959
 Borniopsis macrophtalmensis (B. Morton & Scott, 1989)
 Borniopsis maipoensis (B. Morton & Scott, 1989)
 Borniopsis mortoni Goto & Ishikawa, 2016
 Borniopsis nodosa (B. Morton & Scott, 1989)
 Borniopsis ochetostomae (B. Morton & Scott, 1989)
 Borniopsis sagamiensis (Habe, 1961)
 Borniopsis striatissima (G. B. Sowerby II, 1865)
 Borniopsis subsinuata (Lischke, 1871)
 Borniopsis tsurumaru Habe, 1959
 Borniopsis yamakawai (Yokoyama, 1922)
Synonyms
 Borniopsis fujitaniana (Yokoyama, 1927): synonym of Tellimya fujitaniana (Yokoyama, 1927)

References

 Higo, S., Callomon, P. & Goto, Y. (1999) Catalogue and Bibliography of the Marine Shell-Bearing Mollusca of Japan. Elle Scientific Publications, Yao, Japan, 749 pp. 
 Huber M. (2015). Compendium of Bivalves 2. Harxheim: ConchBooks. 907 pp

External links
 

Lasaeidae
Bivalve genera